Nothris sabulosella is a moth in the family Gelechiidae. It was described by Rebel in 1935. It is found in Asia Minor. The Global Lepidoptera Names Index has this name as a synonym of Nothris sulcella.

The wingspan is 21–32 mm. The forewings are usually uniform dusty grey, sometimes sprinkled with darker grey. There is a blackish grey dot at the middle of the cell. The hindwings are shining bright yellowish-grey.

References

Chelariini
Moths described in 1935